Vellaripravinte Changathi (The Dove's Friend) is a 2011 Malayalam film directed by Akku Akbar, starring Dileep and Kavya Madhavan in the lead roles. The film is loosely based on the famous Sulekha murder case.

Plot
Vellaripravinte Changathi is based on the story of film-maker Augustine Joseph who made a Malayalam film in 1966. However, due to some reasons, the film did not make it to the theatres. The 1960s-70s was a period dominated by Prem Nazir, Sathyan, Sheela and others. Unluckily Augustine Joseph was not able to get the film released. Later he commits suicide due to the debts from the production of the film.
After years his son revels the original prints of the film from Gemini Lab and sees it. Later he goes on with releasing the film and tries to find the people who did the characters. The film is well appreciated for the way of narration and picturisation which makes the viewer feels that they are actually watching an old Black and white movie of the 60-70s.

Cast

Production
The film was earlier titled Ithaano Valiya Karyam but later renamed to the present title. It was shot in locations at Thodupuzha, Ernakulam, Pollachi and Kanyakumari.

Awards 
Dileep's role as Mukkom Shajahan / Ravi in this film won the Kerala state film award for the Best actor for the year 2011

Soundtrack

References

External links
 Official website

2010s Malayalam-language films
Films about films
2011 romance films
2011 films
Films set in the 1960s
Indian films based on actual events
Films directed by Akku Akbar
Indian romance films
Films shot in Munnar
Films shot in Kochi
Films shot in Pollachi
Romance films based on actual events